"Back in Love Again" is a song by American singer and songwriter Donna Summer from her I Remember Yesterday album. Summer combines her trademark disco beats with a 1960s sound on this track. The song is actually a re-working of a track called "Something's in the Wind", which was a B-side to "Denver Dream", a single released by Summer in The Netherlands and Belgium in 1974. The song peaked at #29 on the UK singles chart.

References

1978 singles
Donna Summer songs
Songs written by Pete Bellotte
Songs written by Giorgio Moroder
Songs written by Donna Summer
Song recordings produced by Giorgio Moroder
Song recordings produced by Pete Bellotte
1977 songs
GTO Records singles